Baptist Bible College is the name of two schools in the United States:
Baptist Bible College & Seminary, Clarks Summit, Pennsylvania (The school changed its name to Summit University on April 20, 2015, and later to Clarks Summit University)
Baptist Bible College (Springfield, Missouri) (a branch campus once existed in Massachusetts, now called Boston Baptist College)

Baptist Bible College may also refer to:
Free Will Baptist Bible College, Nashville, Tennessee
Heartland Baptist Bible College, Oklahoma City, Oklahoma
Maranatha Baptist Bible College, Watertown, Wisconsin
Northland Baptist Bible College, Dunbar, Wisconsin
Pillsbury Baptist Bible College, Owatonna, Minnesota